The Vietnamese rebellion of 1420, also known as Lê Ngạ's Uprising, was a Vietnamese anti-Chinese rebellion led by a former slave named Lê Ngạ, during the Ming colonial rule in northern Vietnam.

In 1407, around 9,000 Vietnamese elitists, including scholars, craftmen, physicians, medicine experts were shipped to China, where these people were retrained in Chinese and could be sent back to Ming-occupying Dai Viet as bureaucrats. In addition, 7,700 Vietnamese tradesmen, artisans and workers were sent to Peking, the second capital of Ming Empire to built the Forbidden City, while the Ming state took direct control over Dai Viet's metal mines, precious aromatics and pearls.

In 1420, Lê Ngạ rallied people to the woods of Lạng Sơn and subsequently declared king. He said to his followers, "If you want to be rich, follow me!" The rebels marched down the Red River Delta, seized Xương Giang. Lê Ngạ's former slave owner saw Ngạ and attacked him. The Chinese military commander of Jiaozhi–Marquis Li Bin, arrived and forced Lê Ngạ's rebels to flee into the mountains. After hearing the news, Emperor Zhu Di felt angry and demanded that Lê Ngạ be captured and transported to the Ming capital. Unable to immediately have the emperor's demand succeed, Li Bin seized and sent an innocent man instead, claiming that it was Lê Ngạ. 

Lê Ngạ would not surrender until Huang Fu–the surveillance and prosecution commissioner of Jiaozhi, intervened.

Notes
Footnote

Citations

References

 
 
 

15th century in Vietnam
Wars involving the Ming dynasty
Rebellions in Asia
Conflicts in 1420
15th-century rebellions
Yongle Emperor